Mungret/St. Paul's GAA is a Gaelic Athletic Association club located in Mungret, County Limerick, Ireland. The club fields teams in both hurling and Gaelic football.

History

The original Mungret club was one of the first clubs formed in Limerick after the establishment of the Gaelic Athletic Association in 1884. The club was very much to the fore in the early days of the GAA but, like many other clubs of the time, the Parnell split took its toll on club membership with the result that the club disbanded. The club was eventually reformed under the Mungret/St. Paul's banner in 1929, by the then headmaster of Mungret national school, Mr. P. J. Larkin, who was instrumental in sparking a Gaelic games revival in the parish.

Honours

 Limerick Premier Intermediate Hurling Championship: 2021
 Limerick Intermediate Hurling Championship: 1975, 2016
 Limerick Junior Hurling Championship: 1936, 1940, 1945, 1969, 2006

Notable players

Brian Begley
Dave Bulfin
Andy McCallin
Liam O'Donoghue

References

External links
Mungret/St. Paul's GAA site

Gaelic games clubs in County Limerick
Gaelic football clubs in County Limerick
Hurling clubs in County Limerick